The Daniel Hoan Memorial Bridge is a tied-arch bridge that connects Interstate 794 in downtown Milwaukee, Wisconsin, to the Lake Freeway across the Milwaukee River inlet. Originally called the Harbor Bridge, it was renamed after Daniel Hoan, one of the longest serving mayors of Milwaukee.

History 
It was designed by the firm Howard, Needles, Tammen & Bergendoff and in 1975 won the American Institute of Steel Construction (AISC) Long Span Bridge Award. Although construction on the bridge lasted briefly from 1970 until 1972, it did not open to traffic until 1977 due to the era's freeway revolts against the planned Milwaukee County freeway system. This halted completion of the connecting roadways and led to the Hoan Bridge being known as "The Bridge to Nowhere."

It was widely held that the bridge in its unfinished state was used as the site of a car chase scene in the movie The Blues Brothers, author Mathiew J. Prigge in a two part article on the bridges history for the Shepherd Express, pointed out that the film was actually shot two years after the bridge was opened in 1977, he identified the scenes as being filmed on another incomplete section of I-794. Eventually, the bridge connections were completed in 1998, when the Lake Parkway (Wisconsin Highway 794) opened between the bridge's southernmost exit, connecting the bridge between the Bay View neighborhood and downtown Milwaukee's southeastern tip.

Closure and reconstruction

The Hoan Bridge was temporarily closed on December 13, 2000, after two of the three support beams of the lakefront span failed, causing the north-bound lanes to buckle and sag by 4 feet leaving the span in a near collapsed state. No motorists were injured when the bridge failed. On December 28, 2000, engineers used explosives to remove the damaged section. The southbound lanes were restricted to one lane in each direction for eight months while the damaged northbound span was reconstructed, and the remainder of the bridge underwent extensive rehabilitation and retrofitting. Two lanes in each direction were reintroduced on October 10, 2001, and the bridge was fully reopened the following month. According to the Milwaukee Journal-Sentinel, at the time of its failure, the six lanes of the bridge had carried an average of only 36,590 cars per day. A total of $16 million was spent to demolish and replace the damaged section and retrofit the remainder of the bridge. Experts believe that improperly designed welds between the lower lateral bracing and floorbeams along with a period of extreme cold and snow led to the partial collapse of the Hoan Bridge.

Rehabilitation
A total rehabilitation of the bridge has been nearly completed (as of September 2016) in conjunction with related construction on I-794 and its interchange. The rehabilitation plan removed and replaced the bridge deck, other structural adjustments, and the cleaning and repainting of the bridge's steel. The improvements are expected to extend the life span of the bridge by 40 to 50 years.

Light The Hoan Bridge
In May 2018, a private campaign named "Light the Hoan bridge" was created to light up the bridge. The project will cost between $4 million and $5 million.

As of January 30, 2020, founders of this group stated they were still on track to reach their goal of being lit by the time Milwaukee hosts the Democratic National Convention later that summer. The next fundraising milestone is set for mid-April.

After 2 years of fundraising the bridge was finally lit on October 22, 2020. The bridge will be lit every night thereafter, featuring various colors and light sequences.

Gallery

See also

References

External links

Light the Hoan
Hoan Bridge on Wisconsin Highways
 
Hoan Alone Short film about suicide awareness and three stories relating to the popularity of this bridge for that purpose.

Buildings and structures in Milwaukee
Transportation in Milwaukee
Bridges completed in 1977
Bridge disasters in the United States
Bridge disasters caused by engineering error
Through arch bridges in the United States
Road bridges in Wisconsin
Bridges on the Interstate Highway System
2000 in Wisconsin
Transportation disasters in Wisconsin
1977 establishments in Wisconsin
Interstate 94
Steel bridges in the United States
Bridges to nowhere